The Legislative Assembly of Amazonas ( or ALEAM) is the state legislature of Amazonas. The parliament was founded in 1852 as the Provincial Legislature of the province of Amazonas. It has been installed in four different buildings, the current headquarters was opened on July 28, 2006.

Deputies
MDB
Belarmino Lins
Marco Antônio Chico Preto
Marcos Rotta
Nelson Azedo
Vicente Lopes
PTB
Vera Lúcia Castelo Branco
Walzenir Falcão
PSD
David Almeida
PP
Adjuto Afonso
Conceição Sampaio
Wallace Souza
PR
Ricardo Nicolau
Sabá Reis
PCdoB
José Lobo
Wilson Lisboa (replacement of Eron Bezerra).
PV
Ângelus Figueira
DEM
Therezinha Ruiz
PSDB
Arthur Bisneto
PHS
Liberman Moreno
PMN
Carlos Almeida (replacement of Francisco Souza).
PRP
Edilson Gurgel
PSB
Josué Neto
PPS
Luiz Castro
PT
Sinésio Campos

Licensed
PCdoB
Eron Bezerra (Secretary of SEPROR)
PSC
Francisco Souza

References

External links
 http://www.ale.am.gov.br/

Legislative Assembly of Amazonas (Brazilian state)
Amazonas